Buddhadeb Mitra (born 1 June 1952) is an Indian former cricketer. He played two first-class matches for Bengal in 1974/75.

See also
 List of Bengal cricketers

References

1952 births
Living people
Indian cricketers
Bengal cricketers
Cricketers from Kolkata